Dimorphite, chemical name arsenic sesquisulfide (As4S3), is a very rare orange-yellow arsenic sulfide mineral. In nature, dimorphite forms primarily by deposition in volcanic fumaroles at temperatures of 70–80 °C (158–176 °F).  Dimorphite was first discovered in such a fumarole near Naples, Italy in 1849 by the mineralologist Arcangelo Scacchi (1810–1893). Since its discovery, dimorphite has been found in the Alacrán silver mine near Copiapó, Chile.  It has also been reported from Cerro de Pasco, Peru, and the Lavrion District Mines in Attica, Greece.

Properties and applications

Dimorphite has two crystal forms, Α- and Β-. This property gives rise to its name, which comes from the Greek for "two" and "form."  Dimorphite transitions between its α- and β- forms at around 130 °C (266 °F).

Dimorphite can be synthesized by melting arsenic and sulfur together in the proper molar ratios in vacuum.

Initial research indicates the possibility of using synthetic dimorphite in the development of gas sensors, due to the semiconductive properties of dimorphite.

References

Arsenic minerals
Sulfide minerals
Orthorhombic minerals
Minerals in space group 62